Igor Viktorovich Belyay (born 19 October 1976) is a former Belarusian professional football player. He also holds Russian citizenship.

External links
 

1976 births
Living people
Belarusian footballers
Association football midfielders
Belarusian expatriate footballers
Expatriate footballers in Russia
Russian footballers
FC Dnepr Rogachev players
FC Naftan Novopolotsk players
FC Torpedo Mogilev players
FC Sakhalin Yuzhno-Sakhalinsk players
FC Zhlobin players
Belarusian Premier League players
People from Mogilev
Sportspeople from Mogilev Region